The Hayes Theatre is a 111-seat theatre specialising in music theatre and cabaret in Potts Point, Sydney, Australia. It is named after the Australian performer Nancye Hayes.

Hayes Theatre Co was established at the former Darlinghurst Theatre after the Darlinghurst Theatre Company moved to the nearby Eternity Playhouse.

Its first production, a revival of Sweet Charity, opened in January 2014. The production transferred to the Sydney Opera House and a national tour, and was nominated for and received multiple Helpmann Awards.

The Hayes Theatre Co has gone on to secure a reputation nationally and internationally for its bold work and award-winning performances.

Notable performers who have performed at the Hayes include Nancye Hayes, Caroline O'Connor, David Campbell, Verity Hunt-Ballard, Simon Burke, Mitchel Butel, Emma Matthews, Genevieve Lemon, Rowan Witt, Virginia Gay, Tim Draxl, Hellen Dallimore, Bobby Fox, Seann Miley Moore, Trevor Ashley, Marika Aubrey, Blake Bowden, Paul Capsis, Chloe Dallimore, Esther Hannaford, Lucy Maunder, Timomatic, Hayden Tee, Amanda Harrison, Elise McCann, and Bert LaBonté.

Productions
2014 – Sweet Charity, The Drowsy Chaperone, Truth, Beauty, and a Picture of You, Love and Death and an American Guitar, Love Bites, Miracle City, Beyond Desire
2015 – Next to Normal, Blood Brothers, Freeway – The Chet Baker Journey, Dogfight †, Akio!, Heathers †, Master Class, High Society, Rent, Violet †
2016 – The Fantasticks, Reviewing the Situation, Little Shop of Horrors, Rent, The Detective's Handbook, Xanadu, You're a Good Man, Charlie Brown, Liza's Back! (is broken), Songs for a New World, Side Show, Mack and Mabel
2017 – Cabaret, Calamity Jane, Big Fish, Only Heaven Knows, Mame, Under the Covers, Blue: The Songs of Joni Mitchell, Melba, Me and My Girl, Assassins, An Evening With Nancye Hayes, High Fidelity
2018 – Darlinghurst Nights, The View UpStairs, In the Heights, Big River: The Adventures of Huckleberry Finn, Carmen, Live or Dead, Carlotta: Queen of the Cross, Gypsy, Cry-Baby †, She Loves Me, Meet Me in St. Louis, Evie May Aspects of Love
2019 – Monty Python's Spamalot, Applause, Pictures: Songs from Movie Musicals, I Sing Songs, American Psycho †, Razorhurst, Catch Me If You Can, Caroline, or Change †, Hayes@theHayes, 30 Something, The Sentimental Bloke, Carlotta: I'm Not Dead Yet, Darlings, Michael Griffiths: Songs by Kylie, H.M.S. Pinafore
2020 – Irene, The Life of Us, The Rise and Disguise of Elizabeth R, The Bridges of Madison County
2021 – Young Frankenstein, Well-Behaved Women, Half Time, Merrily We Roll Along
2022 – Lizzie, Head over Heels †, At the Crossroads, Brigadoon, Dubbo Championship Wrestling, Bonnie & Clyde †, Blue: The Songs of Joni Mitchell, In Loving Memory, Jekyll & Hyde, Bells Are Ringing, Bad Guy: Hayden Tee, Maverick Newman In Conversation with Maverick Newman, Anyone Can Whistle, Godspell, Blacklisted, Nice Work If You Can Get It
2023 – Urinetown, Gentlemen Prefer Blondes, I Want it That Gay, Metropolis, The Lucky Country

† Australian premiere

References

External links

Theatres in Sydney
Theatre in Sydney
Theatre companies in Australia